Farah Nadeem is a Pakistani actress. She is known for her roles in dramas Jaal, Adhoora Bandhan, Tarap, Besharam, Aakhir Kab Tak, Mere Humsafar and Kam Zarf.

Early life
Farah was born on June 3, 1970 in Karachi, Pakistan. She completed her graduation from University of Karachi.

Career
She made her debut as an actress in 1998. She first appeared in PTV Channel dramas. Farah appeared in dramas Kashish, Tipu Sultan and Sham Se Pehle in year 1998 and Who Kaun Hai in the year 2000. She also appeared in dramas Pyarey Afzal, Mera Naam Yousuf Hai, Dharkan and Besharam.

Filmography

Television

Telefilm

Awards and nominations

References

External links
 
 

1970 births
Living people
20th-century Pakistani actresses
PTV Award winners
Pakistani television actresses
21st-century Pakistani actresses